Padichakallan is a 1969 Indian Malayalam-language film, directed by M. Krishnan Nair and produced by A. L. Sreenivasan. The film stars Prem Nazir, Adoor Bhasi, Manavalan Joseph and Pappukutty Bhagavathar. The film had musical score by G. Devarajan.

Cast

Prem Nazir
Adoor Bhasi
Manavalan Joseph
Pappukutty Bhagavathar
Sreelatha Namboothiri
T. R. Omana
Aranmula Ponnamma
Bharathi Vishnuvardhan
K. P. Ummer
Krishnan
Latha
Paravoor Bharathan
Radhika
Snehalatha
T. K. Balachandran
 Bharathi Vishnuvardhan (Heroine)

Soundtrack
The music was composed by G. Devarajan with lyrics by Vayalar Ramavarma.

References

External links
 

1969 films
1960s Malayalam-language films
Films directed by M. Krishnan Nair